James Hieb is an American politician who is a member of the Oregon House of Representatives for the 51st district.
On August 17, 2022 Hieb was arrested while intoxicated and carrying a concealed loaded handgun at the Clackamas County Fair and Rodeo when police were called for a confrontation with woman who asked him to put out a cigarette. In 2021 video emerged of Hieb using pepper spray and marching with the Far Right militant group, the Proud Boys, during a political demonstration in Portland, Oregon.

Electoral History

2022

References

Living people
Year of birth missing (living people)
Republican Party members of the Oregon House of Representatives
21st-century American politicians
Place of birth missing (living people)
People from Clackamas County, Oregon